Upton is a hamlet in Hampshire, England, located approximately 1 mile north of Nursling.

It lies beside the main Romsey Road (A3057) leading north from Shirley as it rises over Horns Hill. In the 19th century the hamlet consisted of one or two cottages and a smithy, as well as country house known as  Upton House. The housing development of Upton Crescent was built in the 1930s on the site of the former Upton House. The hamlet is near the starting point of the M271 motorway.

References

Hamlets in Hampshire
Test Valley